Vouarces is a commune in the Marne department in north-eastern France. Vouarces offers a hotel service. As of 2007 its population is 59.

See also
Communes of the Marne department

References

Communes of Marne (department)